D'Aguilar Street (formerly ) is a street in Central, Hong Kong.

It is named after George Charles d'Aguilar (1784–1855), Major General and Lieutenant Governor of Hong Kong from 1843 to 1848.

Location
D'Aguilar Street is an L-shaped street starting from Queen's Road Central, west of Entertainment Building facing straight to Theatre Lane. It runs uphill and meets Stanley Street, Wellington Street, Wo On Lane and Lan Kwai Fong (twice). It turns after meeting Lan Kwai Fong and ends at the junction with Wyndham Street, Glenealy and Lower Albert Road near the Fringe Club.

History
D'Aguilar Street was the location of the clinic of Filipino national hero José Rizal who lived in Hong Kong from the December 1891 to June 1892.

Features
The higher section of D'Aguilar Street, together with Lan Kwai Fong, is a famous site for night life in Hong Kong. The area is collectively called Lan Kwai Fong, after the name of one of its streets. Foreign restaurants and bars can be found in the area.

See also

 List of streets and roads in Hong Kong

Central, Hong Kong
Roads on Hong Kong Island